Ebrahim Sheibani is an Iranian economist who served as the 16th governor of the Central Bank of Iran from 2003 to 2007. He held the longest tenure (19 years) as a member of the board of governors in Iran's central bank history. Before his appointment as the governor, he was the deputy of economic affairs and the secretary general of the Central Bank of Iran from 1989 to 2003. In 2007, Sheibani resigned due to conflicts with President Ahmadinejad over economic policies and was appointed as the Iran's Ambassador to Austria, Slovenia, and Slovakia.

He also served as the chairman of the money and credit council, the stock exchange council, and the banks supreme council of Iran. Besides his executive positions, he has been a faculty member of the economics department at the University of Tehran since 1991.

He received his PhD and MA in economics from Indiana University Bloomington, USA and his post-graduate diploma in Statistics and National Accounting from the International Institute of Social Studies, The Hague, Netherlands. Prior to that, he earned his MA and BA in economics from the University of Tehran.

Sheibani is a published poet and has three children. His wife Zohre Afsharian, PhD in economics from Indiana University, is also a full professor of economics at Alzahra University.

References

Iranian economists
Living people
Indiana University alumni
Ambassadors of Iran to Austria
Ambassadors of Iran to Slovenia
Ambassadors of Iran to Slovakia
Governors of the Central Bank of Iran
Year of birth missing (living people)